Heddiw ("Today") was a monthly Welsh-language  magazine, containing essays, short stories, book reviews, and advertisements. It was published between 1937 and 1942 by Gwasg Heddiw, a publisher based in Watford that was active in the 1940s, and was later merged with Gwasg Gee. Heddiw was edited by Aneurin ap Talfan and Dafydd Jenkins.

The magazine has been digitized by the Welsh Journals Online project at the National Library of Wales.

External links
Heddiw at Welsh Journals Online

Monthly magazines published in the United Kingdom
Defunct literary magazines published in the United Kingdom
Magazines established in 1937
Magazines disestablished in 1942
Welsh-language magazines
Literary magazines published in Wales
Book review magazines